The Art Institute of Buffalo was an art school in Buffalo, New York. It opened its doors in 1931, and continued to produce graduates until the institute closed in 1956. The faculty included a number of well-known artists. Many students of the institute went on the successful careers as professional artists, most settling in western New York.

Institute faculty 

The institute had many well-known artists on the faculty, including Charles E. Burchfield, Edwin Dickinson, David Foster Pratt, Tony Sisti, Earl Stroh, Isaac Soyer, and William B. Rowe who directed the institute from 1942 until 1945.

The best known member of the institute was Charles Burchfield. By the time he joined the faculty in 1950, Burchfield was already hailed as a "distinguished American painter". While at the institute, he taught watercolor and oil painting. Burchfield had an informal teaching style, and often took his students outdoors to work from nature. Following classes, it was common for him to join students for coffee at a local restaurant. In addition to his classes, Burchfield also gave private lesson at the institute.

William Ehrich became a popular sculpture instructor by open carving demonstration  at AIB after immigrating to the United States in 1929. He received the appointment as an instructor in 1933  and produced public works through his demonstration teaching at AIB such as the wooden sculpture of St. Andrew displayed at Buffalo's St. Andrew's Episcopal Church. In May, 1938, he was appointed supervisor of the Buffalo Unit of the Federal Art Project.

History

The institute was founded in 1931. An agreement with the University at Buffalo's School of Education allowed students of the institute to earn credit toward a bachelor's degree in Art Education.

According to William Rowe, the Art Institute was intended to be "a school, a gallery, a meeting place for artists, art students and the public with no discrimination and no competition, encouraging maximum freedom of self-expression." The Art Institute was regarded by many observers in the Buffalo community as a Bohemian artist colony, and many Institute artists saw themselves that way.

Over the years, the institute presented many exhibits, including some for artists who were not from the region. They also scheduled art sales where the art was of both high quality and reasonably priced. In May 1937, Edwin Dickinson organized an art exhibition at which Jackson Pollock sold a work entitled Cotton Pickers. During World War II, proceeds were sometimes donated to the war effort. After the war, the Servicemen's Readjustment Act of 1944 (also known as the "G. I. Bill") bought a large influx of students to the institute. However, when the flow of veterans slowed in the mid-fifties the institute had to cut back its classes. It was closed in 1956. Today, the archives of the Art Institute of Buffalo are conserved in the Burchfield-Penney Art Center which is part of Buffalo State College.

References

External links
Buffalo State College - Art Institute of Buffalo 75th Anniversary Exhibition
 Burchfield-Penny Art Center

Art schools in New York (state)
Federal Art Project
Culture of Buffalo, New York
Education in Buffalo, New York
Educational institutions established in 1931
Educational institutions disestablished in 1956
Defunct private universities and colleges in New York (state)
1931 establishments in New York (state)
1956 disestablishments in New York (state)